This is a list of fish found in and around Great Britain, in both fresh water (lakes, rivers, streams and man-made pools) and salt water. This list includes species that are native to Great Britain, as well as those which have been introduced from other countries.

Agnatha - jawless fish

Myxini - hagfish

Myxinidae - hagfish
Atlantic hagfish, Myxine glutinosa
White-headed hagfish, Myxine ios

Petromyzontiformes - lampreys

Petromyzontidae - northern lampreys
River lamprey, Lampetra fluviatilis
Brook lamprey, Lampetra planeri
Sea lamprey, Petromyzon marinus

Chondrichthyes - cartilaginous fish

Chimaeriformes - ratfish

Chimaeridae - short-nosed chimaeras
Ratfish, Chimaera monstrosa
Opal chimaera, Chimaera opalescens
Smalleyed rabbitfish, Hydrolagus affinis
Large-eyed rabbitfish, Hydrolagus mirabilis

Rhinochimaeridae - long-nosed chimaeras
Narrownose chimaera, Harriotta raleighana
Broadnose chimaera, Rhinochimaera atlantica

Hexanchiformes - cow sharks and frilled sharks

Chlamydoselachidae - frilled sharks
Frilled shark, Chlamydoselachus anguineus

Hexanchidae - cow sharks
Sharpnose sevengill shark, Heptranchias perlo
Bluntnose sixgill shark, Hexanchus griseus

Squaliformes - dogfish sharks

Squalidae - true dogfish
Spurdog, Squalus acanthias

Echinorhinidae - bramble sharks
Bramble shark, Echinorhinus brucus

Dalatiidae - kitefin sharks
Kitefin shark, Dalatias licha

Centrophoridae - gulper sharks
Leafscale gulper shark, Centrophorus squamosus
Birdbeak dogfish, Deania calcia

Etmopteridae - lantern sharks
Black dogfish, Centroscyllium fabricii
Great lanternshark, Etmopterus princeps
Velvet belly lanternshark, Etmopterus spinax

Oxynotidae - rough sharks
Angular roughshark, Oxynotus centrina
Sailfin roughshark, Oxynotus paradoxus

Somniosidae - sleeper sharks
Longnose velvet dogfish, Centroselachus crepidater
Portuguese dogfish, Centroscymnus coelolepis
Smallmouth velvet dogfish, Scymnodon obscurus
Knifetooth dogfish, Scymnodon  
ringens
Greenland shark, Somniosus microcephalus
Velvet dogfish, Zameus squamulosus

Lamniformes - mackerel sharks

Cetorhinidae - basking sharks
Basking shark, Cetorhinus maximus

Lamnidae - mackerel sharks
Shortfin mako shark, Isurus oxyrinchus
Porbeagle, Lamna nasus
Great white shark, Carcharodon carcharias

Alopiidae - thresher sharks
Thresher shark, Alopias vulpinus

Carchariniformes - ground sharks

Scyliorhinidae - catsharks
Iceland catshark, Apristurus laurussonii
Ghost catshark, Apristurus manis
Black roughscale catshark, Apristurus melanoasper
Blackmouth catshark, Galeus melastomus
Lesser spotted dogfish, Scyliorhinus canicula
Greater spotted dogfish, Scyliorhinus stellaris

Carcharhinidae - requiem sharks
Copper shark, Carcharinus brachyurus
Blue shark, Prionace glauca

Pseudotriakidae - false catsharks
False catshark, Pseudotriakis microdon

Sphyrnidae - hammerheads
Smooth hammerhead, Sphyrna zygaena

Triakidae - houndsharks
Tope, Galeorhinus galeus
Starry smooth-hound, Mustelus asterias
Common smooth-hound, Mustelus mustelus

Squatiniformes - angel sharks

Squatinidae - angel sharks
Angel shark, Squatina squatina

Rajiformes - skates and rays

Rajidae - skates
Arctic skate, Amblyraja hyperborea
Thorny skate, Amblyraja radiata
Spinetail ray, Bathyraja spinicauda
Common skate, Dipturus batis
Norwegian skate, Dipturus nidarosiensis
Long-nosed skate, Dipturus oxyrinchus
Sandy ray, Leucoraja circularis
Shagreen ray, Leucoraja fullonica
Cuckoo ray, Leucoraja naevus
Blue ray, Neoraja caerulea
Blonde ray, Raja brachyura
Thornback ray, Raja clavata
Smalleyed ray, Raja microocellata
Spotted ray, Raja montagui
Undulate ray/painted ray, Raja undulata
Deepwater ray, Rajella bathyphila
Bigelow's ray, Rajella bigelowi
Sailray, Rajella lintea
Round ray, Rajella fyllae
Bottlenose skate, Rostroraja alba

Myliobatiformes - stingrays

Dasyatidae - whiptail stingrays
Common stingray, Dasyatis pastinaca
Pelagic stingray, Pteroplatytrygon violacea

Myliobatidae - eagle rays
Devil fish, Mobula mobular
Atlantic eagle ray, Myliobatis aquila

Torpediniformes - electric rays

Torpedinidae - torpedo rays
Marbled electric ray, Torpedo marmorata
Atlantic torpedo, Torpedo nobiliana

Osteichthyes - bony fish

Acipenseriformes - sturgeon

Acipenseridae - sturgeon
Atlantic sturgeon, Acipenser oxyrinchus (extinct in British waters)
European sea sturgeon, Acipenser sturio

Anguilliformes - true eels

Anguillidae - freshwater eels
European eel, Anguilla anguilla

Muraenidae - morays
Mediterranean moray, Muraena helena

Congridae - congers
Conger eel, Conger conger

Nettastomatidae - witch eels
Whipsnout sorcerer, Venefica proboscidea

Nemichthyidae - snipe eels
Avocet snipe eel, Avocettina infans
Slender snipe eel, Nemichthys scolopaceus

Synaphobranchidae - cutthroat eels
Deepwater arrowtooth eel, Histiobranchus bathybius
Robins's cutthroat eel, Ilyophis arx
Saldanha's cutthroat eel, Ilyophis blachei 
Muddy arrowtooth eel, Ilyophis brunneus
Kaup's arrowtooth eel, Synaphobranchus kaupii

Notacanthiformes - spiny eels

Halosauridae - halosaurs
Abyssal halosaur, Halosauropsis macrochir
Johnson's halosaur, Halosaurus johnsonianus

Notacanthidae - spiny eels
Shortfin spiny eel, Notacanthus bonaparte
Spiny eel, Notacanthus chemnitzii
Longnose tapirfish, Polyacanthonotus challengeri
Smallmouth spiny eel, Polyacanthonotus rissoanus

Saccopharyngiformes - gulper eels

Saccopharyngidae - gulper eels
Gulper eel, Saccopharynx ampullaceus

Eurypharyngidae - pelican eels
Pelican eel, Eurypharynx pelecanoides

Clupeiformes - herring

Clupeidae - true herrings
Allis shad, Alosa alosa
Twaite shad, Alosa fallax
Atlantic herring, Clupea harengus
Sprat, Clupea sprattus
European pilchard, Sardina pilchardus

Engraulidae - anchovies
European anchovy, Engraulis encrasicolus

Cypriniformes - carp and allies

Cyprinidae - carp, minnows and barbs
Common bream/bronze bream/skimmer bream, Abramis brama
Bleak, Alburnus alburnus
Asp, Aspius aspius (introduced)
Barbel, Barbus barbus
Silver bream, Blicca bjoerkna
Goldfish, Carassius auratus (introduced)
Crucian carp, Carassius carassius / Carassius cuvieri
Grass carp, Ctenopharygodon idella (introduced)
Common carp/mirror carp/leather carp/koi, Cyprinus carpio (introduced)
Gudgeon, Gobio gobio
Silver carp, Hypophthalmichthys molitrix (introduced)
Bighead carp, Hypophthalmichthys nobilis (introduced)
Sunbleak, Leucaspius delineatus (introduced)
Chub, Leuciscus cephalus
Orfe, Leuciscus idus (introduced)
Common dace, Leuciscus leuciscus
Eurasian minnow, Phoxinus phoxinus
Fathead minnow, Pimephales promelas (introduced)
Topmouth gudgeon, Pseudorasbora parva (introduced)
European bitterling, Rhodeus amarus (introduced)
Amur bitterling, Rhodeus sericeus (introduced)
Roach, Rutilus rutilus
Common rudd, Scardinius erythrophthalmus
Tench, Tinca tinca

Catostomidae - suckers
White sucker, Catostomus commersonii (introduced)

Cobitidae - true loaches
Spined loach, Cobitis taenia
European weatherfish, Misgurnus fossilis (introduced)

Nemacheilidae - stone loaches
Stone loach, Nemacheilus barbatulus

Siluriformes - catfish

Siluridae - Eurasian catfish
Wels catfish, Silurus glanis (introduced)

Ictaluridae - bullhead catfish
Black bullhead, Ameiurus melas (introduced)
Brown bullhead, Ameiurus nebulosus (introduced)
Channel catfish, Ictalurus punctatus (introduced)

Loricariidae - armoured catfish
Suckermouth catfish, Hypostomus plecostomus (introduced)

Esociformes - pike

Esocidae - pike
Northern pike, Esox lucius

Osmeriformes - smelt

Osmeridae - smelt
Capelin, Mallotus villosus
European smelt, Osmerus eperlanus

Argentiniformes - argentines and slickheads

Alepocephalidae - slickheads
Baird's slickhead, Alepocephalus bairdii
Risso's smooth-head, Alepocephalus rostratus
Longfin smooth-head, Conocara macropterum
Elongate smooth-head, Conocara microlepis
Murray's smooth-head, Conocara murrayi
Salmon smooth-head, Conocara salmoneum
Blackhead salmon, Narcetes stomias
Abyssal smooth-head, Rinoctes nasutus
Softskin smooth-head, Rouleina attrita
Madeiran smooth-head, Rouleina maderensis
Bluntsnout smooth-head, Xenodermichthys copei

Leptochilichthyidae - longjaw smooth-heads
Agassiz' smooth-head, Leptochilichthys agassizii

Platytroctidae - tubeshoulders
Bighead searsid, Holtbyrnia anomala
Maul's searsid, Maulisia mauli
Multipore searsid, Normichthys operosus
Schnakenbeck's searsid, Sagamichthys schnakenbecki
Koefoed's searsid, Searsia koefoedi

Argentinidae - argentines
Greater argentine, Argentina silus
Common argentine, Argentina sphyracna

Microstomatidae - pencil smelts
Slender argentine, Microstoma microstoma
Greenland argentine, Nansenia groenlandica
Mediterranean large-eyed argentine, Nansenia oblita

Bathylagidae - deep-sea smelt
Goiter blacksmelt, Bathylagus euryops

Opisthoproctidae - barrel-eyes
Spookfish, Dolichopteryx rostrata
Barrel-eye, Opisthoproctus soleatus

Salmoniformes - salmon and trout

Salmonidae - salmon and trout
European cisco, Coregonus albula
Arctic cisco, Coregonus autumnalis
Lake whitefish, Coregonus clupeaformis (introduced)
Powan, Coregonus clupeioides
European whitefish, Coregonus lavaretus 
Houting, Coregonus oxyrinchus (extinct in Britain)
Gwyniad, Coregonus pennantii
Pollan, Coregonus pollan
Schelly, Coregonus stigmaticus
Vendace, Coregonus vandesius
Huchen, Hucho hucho (introduced)
Pink salmon, Oncorhynchus gorbuscha (introduced)
Silverbrite salmon, Oncorhynchus keta (introduced)
Coho salmon, Oncorhynchus kisutch (introduced)
Cherry salmon (yamame-trout), Oncorhynchus masou (introduced)
Rainbow trout, Oncorhynchus mykiss (introduced)
Chinook salmon, Oncorhynchus tshawytscha (introduced)
Ferox trout, Salmo ferox
Sonaghan trout, Salmo nigripinnis
Atlantic salmon, Salmo salar
Gillaroo, Salmo stomachicus
Brown trout/sea trout, Salmo trutta
Arctic charr, Salvelinus alpinus
Brook trout, Salvelinus fontinalis (introduced)
Shetland charr, Salvelinus gracillimus
Orkney charr, Salvelinus inframundus
Haddy charr, Salvelinus killinensis
Haweswater charr, Salvelinus lonsdalii
Loch Shin charr, Salvelinus mallochi
North Minch charr, Salvelinus maxillaris
Lake trout, Salvelinus namaycush (introduced)
Lough Leane charr, Salvelinus obtusus
Llyn Peris charr, Salvelinus perisii
Rannoch charr, Salvelinus struanensis
Windermere charr, Salvelinus willoughbii
Golden charr, Salvelinus youngeri
Grayling, Thymallus thymallus

Stomiiformes - dragonfish and marine hatchetfish

Sternoptychidae - marine hatchetfishes
Half-naked hatchetfish, Argyropelacus hemigymnus
Atlantic hatchetfish, Argyropelacus olfersi
Mueller's pearlside, Maurolicus muelleri
Diaphanous hatchet fish, Sternoptyx diaphana
Constellationfish, Valenciennellus tripunctulatus

Gonostomatidae - bristlemouths
Longray fangjaw, Bonapartia pedaliota
Bristlemouth, Cyclothone alba
Veiled anglemouth, Cyclothone microdon
Elongated bristlemouth fish, Gonostoma elongatum
Spark anglemouth, Sigmops bathyphilus

Stomiidae - dragonfish
Large-eye snaggletooth, Borostomias antarcticus
Long-barbeled dragonfish, Grammatostomias flagellibarba
Barbeled scaleless dragonfish, Leptostomias gladiator
Boa dragonfish, Stomias boa
Threelight dragonfish, Trigonolampa miriceps

Phosichthyidae - lightfish
Rendezvous fish, Polymetme corythaeola
Parin's lightfish, Polymetme thaeocoryla

Aulopiformes - grinners

Paralepididae - barracudinas
Spotted barracudina, Arctozenus risso
Duckbill barracudina, Magnisudis atlantica
Sharpchin barracudina, Paralepis coregonoides
Pike-smelt, Sudis hyalina

Notosudidae - waryfish
Blackfin waryfish, Scopelosaurus lepidus

Alepisauridae - lancetfish
Long-snouted lancetfish, Alepisaurus ferox

Bathysauridae - deep sea lizardfish
Deepsea lizardfish, Bathysaurus ferox

Myctophiformes - lanternfish

Myctophidae - lanternfish
Glacier lanternfish, Benthosema glaciale
Spothead lantern fish, Diaphus metopoclampus
White-spotted lantern fish, Diaphus rafinesquii
Chubby flashlightfish, Electrona risso
Jewel lanternfish, Lampanyctus crocodilus
Diamondcheek lanternfish, Lampanyctus intricarius
Rakery beaconlamp, Lampanyctus macdonaldi
Pygmy lanternfish, Lampanyctus pusillus
Cocco's lantern fish, Lobianchia gemellarii
Spotted lanternfish, Myctophum punctatum
Topside lampfish, Notolychnus valdiviae
Lancet fish, Notoscopelus kroyeri
Arctic telescope, Protomyctophum arcticum
Large scale lantern fish, Symbolophorus veranyi

Lampriformes - opahs and allies

Lampridae - opahs
Opah, Lampris guttatus

Regalecidae - oarfish
Oarfish, Regalecus glesne

Trachipteridae - ribbonfish
Dealfish, Trachipterus arcticus

Gadiformes - cod

Lotidae - lings
Cusk, Brosme brosme
Fivebeard rockling, Ciliata mustela
Northern rockling, Ciliata septentrionalis
Four-bearded rockling, Enchelyopus cimbrius
Arctic rockling, Gaidropsarus argentatus
Bigeye rockling, Gaidropsarus macrophthalmus
Shore rockling, Gaidropsarus mediterraneus
Three-bearded rockling, Gaidropsarus vulgaris
Burbot, Lota lota
Blue ling, Molva dypterygia
Common ling, Molva molva
Spanish ling, Molva macrophthalma

Gadidae - codfishes
Silvery pout, Gadiculus argenteus 
Thor's pout, Gadiculus thori
Atlantic cod, Gadus morhua
Greenland cod, Gadus ogac
Haddock, Melanogrammus aeglefinus
Whiting, Merlangius merlangus
Blue whiting, Micromesistius poutassou
Pollock, Pollachius pollachus
Saithe, Pollachius virens
Tadpole fish, Raniceps raninus
Norway pout, Trisopterus esmarcki
Pouting, Trisopterus luscus
Poor cod, Trisopterus minutus

Merlucciidae - hakes
Byrne's hake, Lyconus brachycolus
European hake, Merluccius merluccius

Phycidae - forkbeards
Greater forkbeard, Phycis blennoides
Common forkbeard, Phycis phycis
Red hake, Urophycis chuss

Macrouridae - grenadiers
Hollowsnout grenadier, Coelorinchus caelorhincus
Spearsnouted grenadier, Coelorinchus labiatus
Abyssal grenadier, Coryphaenoides armatus
Short-bearded grenadier, Coryphaenoides brevibarbis
Carapine grenadier, Coryphaenoides carapinus
Günther's grenadier, Coryphaenoides guentheri
Ghostly grenadier, Coryphaenoides leptolepis
Mediterranean grenadier, Coryphaenoides mediterraneus
Deepwater grenadier, Coryphaenoides profundicolus
Rock grenadier, Coryphaenoides rupestris
Glasshead grenadier, Hymenocephalus italicus
Onion-eye grenadier, Macrourus berglax
Softhead grenadier, Malacocephalus laevis
Common Atlantic grenadier, Nezumia aequalis
Whiptail grenadier, Pseudonezumia flagellicauda
Roughnose grenadier, Trachyrincus murrayi
Roughsnout grenadier, Trachyrincus scabrus

Moridae - codlings
Byrne's codling, Guttigadus latifrons
Slender codling, Halargyreus johnsonii
North Atlantic codling, Lepidion eques
Common mora, Mora moro

Lophiiformes - anglerfish

Lophiidae - goosefish
Blackbellied angler, Lophius budegassa
Monkfish, Lophius piscatorius

Ceratiidae - sea devils
Kroyer's deep-sea anglerfish, Ceratias holboelli

Himantolophidae - footballfish
Atlantic footballfish, Himantolophus groenlandicus

Oneirodidae - dreamers
Can-opener smoothdream, Chaenophryne longiceps
 Oneirodes carlsbergi
Bulbous dreamer, Oneirodes eschrichtii

Batrachoidiformes - toadfish

Batrachoididae - toadfish
Lusitanian toadfish, Halobatrachus didactylus

Ophidiiformes - pearlfish and cuskeels

Carapidae - pearlfish
Pearlfish, Echiodon drummondii

Aphyonidae - blind cuskeels
Blind cusk eel, Sciadonus galatheae

Ophidiidae - cuskeels
Barbeled snake blenny, Ophidion barbatum
Pudgy cuskeel, Spectrunculus grandis

Bythitidae - brotulas
Allen's brotula, Cataetyx alleni
Koefoed's brotula, Cataetyx laticeps
Viviparous brotula, Thalassobathia pelagica

Mugiliformes - mullet

Mugilidae - mullet
Thicklip grey mullet, Chelon labrosus
Golden grey mullet, Liza aurata
Thinlip mullet, Liza ramada
Flathead grey mullet, Mugil cephalus

Atheriniformes - sand smelts

Atherinidae - sand smelts
Big-scale sand smelt, Atherina boyeri
Sand smelt, Atherina presbyter

Beloniformes - garfish and allies

Belonidae - garfish
Garfish, Belone belone
Short-beaked garfish, Belone svetovidovi

Scomberesocidae - sauries
Atlantic saury, Scomberesox saurus

Exocoetidae - flyingfish
Mediterranean flyingfish, Cheilopogon heterurus
Black wing flyingfish, Hirundichthys rondeletii

Zeiformes - dories

Zeidae - true dories
John Dory, Zeus faber

Oreosomatidae - oreos
False boarfish, Neocyttus helgae

Cyprinodontiformes - toothcarps

Poeciliidae - live-bearers
Guppy, Poecilia reticulata (introduced)

Beryciformes - alfonsinos and allies

Berycidae - alfonsinos
Alfonsino, Beryx decadactylus

Diretmidae - spinyfins
Silver spinyfin, Diretmus argenteus

Trachichthyidae - slimeheads
Orange roughy, Hoplostethus atlanticus
Silver roughy, Hoplostethus mediterraneus

Melamphaidae - ridgeheads
Crested bigscale, Poromitra crassiceps
Black headed bigscale, Poromitra nigriceps
Bean's bigscale, Scopelogadus beanii

Anoplogastridae - fangtooths
Fangtooth, Anoplogaster cornuta

Gasterosteiformes - sticklebacks and seahorses

Centriscidae - snipefish
Longspine snipefish, Macroramphosus scolopax

Fistulariidae - cornetfish
Red cornetfish, Fistularia petimba

Syngnathidae - pipefish and seahorses
Snake pipefish, Entelurus aequoreus
Long-snouted seahorse, Hippocampus guttulatus
Short-snouted seahorse, Hippocampus hippocampus
Common seahorse, Hippocampus ramulosus
Worm pipefish, Nerophis lumbriciformis
Straightnose pipefish, Nerophis ophidion
Greater pipefish, Syngathus acus
Lesser pipefish, Syngnathus rostellatus
Broadnosed pipefish, Syngnathus typhle

Gasterosteidae - sticklebacks
Three-spined stickleback, Gasterosteus aculeatus aculeatus
Smoothtail nine-spined stickleback, Pungitius laevis
Nine-spined stickleback, Pungitius pungitius
Fifteen-spined stickleback, Spinachia spinachia

Tetraodontiformes - ocean sunfish and allies

Molidae - ocean sunfish
Ocean sunfish, Mola mola
Slender sunfish, Ranzania laevis

Balistidae - triggerfish
Grey triggerfish, Balistes capriscus
Rough triggerfish, Canthidermis maculata

Tetraodontidae - pufferfish
Oceanic puffer, Lagocephalus lagocephalus
Blunthead puffer, Sphoeroides pachygaster

Pleuronectiformes - flatfish

Scophthalmidae - turbots
Fourspotted megrim, Lepidorhombus boscii
Megrim, Lepidorhombus whiffiagonis
Norwegian topknot, Phrynorhombus norvegicus
European turbot, Psetta maxima
Brill, Scophthalmus rhombus
Common topknot, Zeugopterus punctatus
Bloch's topknot, Zeugopterus regius

Pleuronectidae - flounders
Torbay sole, Glyptocephalus cynoglossus
Long rough dab, Hippoglossoides platessoides
Atlantic halibut, Hippoglossus hippoglossus
Common dab, Limanda limanda
Lemon sole, Microstomus kitt
European flounder, Platichthys flesus
European plaice, Pleuronectes platessa
Greenland halibut, Reinhardtius hippoglossoides

Soleidae - true soles
Deepwater sole, Bathysolea profundicola
Solenette, Buglossidium luteum
De Brito's sole, Microchirus azevia
Bastard sole, Microchirus theophila
Thick-backed sole, Microchirus variegatus
Sand sole, Pegusa lascaris
Dover sole, Solea solea

Cynoglossidae - tonguefish
Nigerian tonguesole, Cynoglossus browni

Bothidae - scaldfish
Imperial scaldfish, Arnoglossus imperialis
Mediterranean scaldfish, Arnoglossus laterna
Thor's scaldfish, Arnoglossus thori

Scorpaeniformes - scorpionfish and allies

Agonidae - poachers
Pogge, Agonus cataphractus

Scorpaenidae - scorpionfish
Black scorpionfish, Scorpaena porcus
Red scorpionfish, Scorpaena scrofa

Cottidae - sculpins
Atlantic hook-eared sculpin, Artediellus atlanticus
European bullhead, Cottus gobio
Chabot bullhead, Cottus perifretum
Twohorn sculpin, Icelus bucornis
Father lasher, Myoxocephalus scorpius
Long-spined sea scorpion, Taurulus bubalis
Norway bullhead, Taurulus lilljeborgi
Moustache sculpin, Triglops murrayi

Psychrolutidae - fatheads
Polar sculpin, Cottunculus microps
Pallid sculpin, Cottunculus thomsonii

Cyclopteridae - lumpsuckers
Lumpsucker, Cyclopterus lumpus

Liparidae - snailfish
Speckled snailfish, Careproctus aciculipunctatus
Merrett's snailfish, Careproctus merretti
Sea tadpole, Careproctus reinhardti
Common seasnail, Liparis liparis
Montagu's snailfish, Liparis montagui
Deep sea snailfish, Paraliparis abyssorum
Black snailfish, Paraliparis bathybius
 Paraliparis bipolaris
Porcupine snailfish, Paraliparis hystrix

Sebastidae - rockfish (seaperch) 
Bluemouth, Helicolenus dactylopterus
Rose fish, Sebastes marinus
Deepwater redfish, Sebastes mentella
Norway haddock, Sebastes norvegicus
Red perch, Sebastes viviparus
Spiny scorpionfish, Trachyscorpia cristulata

Dactylopteridae - flying gurnards
Flying gurnard, Dactylopterus volitans

Peristediidae - armoured searobins
African armoured searobin, Peristedion cataphractum

Triglidae - gurnards
Red gurnard, Aspitriglia cuculus
Longfin gurnard, Chelidonichthys obscurus
Grey gurnard, Eutriglia gurnardus
Long-finned gurnard, Lepidotrigla argus
Tub gurnard, Trigla lucerna
Piper gurnard, Trigla lyra
Streaked gurnard, Trigloporus lastoviza

Gobiesociformes - clingfish

Gobiesocidae - clingfish
Small-headed clingfish, Apletodon dentatus
Two-spotted clingfish, Diplecogaster bimaculata
Connemara clingfish, Lepadogaster candolii
Shore clingfish, Lepadogaster lepadogaster
Cornish sucker, Lepadogaster purpurea

Perciformes - perchlike fishes

Bramidae - pomfrets
Atlantic pomfret, Brama brama
Atlantic fanfish, Pterycombus brama
Rough pomfret, Taractes asper
Big-scale pomfret, Taractichthys longipinnis

Stromateidae - butterfish
Silver pomfret, Pampus argenteus

Luvaridae - luvars
Luvar, Luvarus imperialis

Callanthiidae - splendid perch
Parrot seaperch, Callanthias ruber

Carangidae - jacks
Vadigo, Campogramma glaycos
Blue runner, Caranx crysos
Pilotfish, Neucrates ductor
Guinean amberjack, Seriola carpenteri
Greater amberjack, Seriola dumerili
Almaco jack, Seriola rivoliana
Derbio, Trachinotus ovatus
Mediterranean horse mackerel, Trachurus mediterraneus 
Atlantic horse mackerel, Trachurus trachurus

Centrarchidae - freshwater sunfish
Rock bass, Ambloplites rupestris (introduced)
Pumpkinseed, Lepomis gibbosus (introduced)
Bluegill, Lepomis macrochirus (introduced)
Smallmouth bass, Micropterus dolomieu (introduced)
Largemouth bass, Micropterus salmoides (introduced)

Echeneidae - remoras
Common remora, Remora remora

Epigonidae - deepwater cardinalfish
Black cardinal fish, Epigonus telescopus

Moronidae - temperate sea bass
European sea bass, Dicentrarchus labrax
Spotted seabass, Dicentrarchus punctatus
Striped bass, Morone saxatilis

Mullidae - goatfish
Red mullet, Mullus barbatus
Striped mullet, Mullus surmuletus

Percidae - true perch
Ruffe, Gymnocephalus cernua
European perch, Perca fluviatilis
Walleye, Sander vitreus (introduced)
Zander, Stizostedion lucioperca (introduced)

Polyprionidae - wreckfish
Atlantic wreckfish, Polyprion americanus

Sciaenidae - drums
Meagre, Argyrosomus regius
Canary drum, Umbrina canariensis
Ombrine, Umbrina cirrosa

Sphyraenidae - barracudas (seapike) 
European barracuda, Sphyraena sphyraena

Coryphaenidae - dolphinfish
Pompano dolphinfish, Coryphaena equiselis

Serranidae - groupers
Goldblotch grouper, Epinephelus costae
Dusky grouper, Epinephelus marginatus
Comber, Serranus cabrilla

Sparidae - seabream
Bogue, Boops boops
Common dentex, Dentex dentex
Pink dentex, Dentex gibbosus
Morocco dentex, Dentex maroccanus
White seabream, Diplodus sargus
Saddled seabream, Oblada melanura
Spanish bream, Pagellus acarne
Blackspot seabream, Pagellus bogaraveo
Pandora bream, Pagellus erythrinus
Pagre, Pagrus auriga
Blue-spotted bream, Pagrus caeruleostictus
Red porgy, Pagrus pagrus
Salema porgy, Sarpa salpa
Gilt-head bream, Sparus aurata
Black sea bream, Spondyliosoma cantharus

Cepolidae - bandfish
Big-eyed red bandfish, Cepola macrophthalma
Red bandfish, Cepola rubescens

Labridae - wrasse
Scale-rayed wrasse, Acantholabrus palloni
Rock cook, Centrolabrus exoletus
Mediterranean rainbow wrasse, Coris julis
Baillon's wrasse, Crenilabrus bailloni
Goldsinny wrasse, Ctenolabrus rupestris
Ballan wrasse, Labrus bergylta
Cuckoo wrasse, Labrus mixtus
Corkwing wrasse, Symphodus melops

Cichlidae - cichlids (tilapia) 
Nile tilapia, Oreochromis niloticus (introduced)
Redbelly tilapia, Tilapia zillii (introduced)

Anarhichadidae - wolffish
Northern wolffish, Anarhichas denticulatus
Atlantic wolffish, Anarhichas lupus
Spotted wolffish, Anarhichas minor

Pholidae - gunnels
Rock gunnel, Pholis gunnellus

Stichaeidae - pricklebacks
Yarrell's blenny, Chirolophis ascanii
Spotted eelpout, Leptoclinus maculatus
Snake blenny, Lumpenus lampretaeformis

Zoarcidae - eelpouts
White eelpout, Lycenchelys alba
Sar's eelpout, Lycenchelys sarsii
Greater eelpout, Lycodes esmarkii
Newfoundland eelpout, Lycodes terraenovae
Vahl's eelpout, Lycodes vahlii
Snubnose eelpout, Pachycara bulbiceps
 Pachycara crassiceps
Viviparous eelpout, Zoarces viviparus

Ammodytidae - sand eels
Raitt's sand eel, Ammodytes marinus
Lesser sand eel, Ammodytes tobianus
Sand lance, Gymnammodytes cicerellus
Smooth sand eel, Gymnammodytes semisquamatus
Corbin's sand eel, Hyperoplus immaculatus
Great sandeel, Hyperoplus lanceolatus

Trachinidae - weevers
Lesser weever, Echiichthys vipera
Greater weever, Trachinus draco

Uranoscopidae - stargazers
Northern stargazer, Astroscopus guttatus
Atlantic stargazer, Astroscopus scaber

Blenniidae - typical blennies
Butterfly blenny, Blennius ocellaris
Montagu's blenny, Coryphoblennius galerita
Shanny, Lipophrys pholis
Combtooth blenny, Lipophrys trigloides
Tompot blenny, Parablennius gattorugine
Peacock blenny, Salaria pavo

Tripterygiidae - threefin blennies
Black-faced blenny, Tripterygion delaisi

Callionymidae - dragonets
Common dragonet, Callionymus lyra
Spotted dragonet, Callionymus maculatus
Reticulated dragonet, Callionymus reticulatus

Gobiidae - gobies
Transparent goby, Aphia minuta
Jeffrey's goby, Buenia jeffreysii
Crystal goby, Crystallogobius linearis
Giant goby, Gobius cobitis
Couch's goby, Gobius couchi
Red-mouthed goby, Gobius cruentatus
Steven's goby, Gobius gasteveni
Black goby, Gobius niger
Rock goby, Gobius paganellus
Spotted goby, Gobiusculus flavescens
Guillet's goby, Lebetus guilleti
Diminutive goby, Lebetus scorpioides
Fries's goby, Leseurigobius friesii
Lozano's goby, Pomatoschistus lozanoi
Common goby, Pomatoschistus microps
Sand goby, Potamoschistus minutus
Norway goby, Pomatoschistus norvegicus
Painted goby, Potamoschistus pictus
Leopard-spotted goby, Thorogobius ephippiatus

Gempylidae - snake mackerels
Escolar, Lepidocybium flavobrunneum
Black gemfish, Nesiarchus nasutus
Oilfish, Ruvettus pretiosus

Trichiuridae - cutlassfish
Black scabbardfish, Aphanopus carbo
Silver scabbardfish, Lepidopus caudatus
Largehead hairtail, Trichiurus lepturus

Scombridae - mackerel and tuna
Wahoo, Acanthocybium solanderi
Bullet tuna, Auxis rochei 	
Frigate tuna, Auxis thazard
Little tunny, Euthynnus alletteratus
Skipjack tuna, Katsuwonus pelamis
Plain bonito, Orcynopsis unicolor
Atlantic bonito, Sarda sarda
Atlantic chub mackerel, Scomber colias
Spanish mackerel, Scomber japonicus
Atlantic mackerel, Scomber scombrus
Albacore, Thunnus alalunga
Yellowfin tuna, Thunnus albacares
Bigeye tuna, Thunnus obesus
Atlantic bluefin tuna, Thunnus thynnus

Xiphiidae - swordfish
Swordfish, Xiphias gladius

Istiophoridae - billfish
Atlantic sailfish, Istiophorus albicans
White marlin, Kajikia albidus

Centrolophidae - medusafish
Rudderfish, Centrolophus niger
Barrelfish, Hyperoglyphe perciformis
Cornish blackfish, Schedophilus medusaphaeus
Imperial blackfish, Schedophilus ovalis

Nomeidae - driftfish
Driftfish, Cubiceps gracilis
Man-of-war fish, Nomeus gronovii
Bluefin driftfish, Psenes pellucidus

Pomatomidae - bluefish
Bluefish, Pomatomus saltatrix

Caproidae - boarfish
Boarfish, Capros aper

See also
 List of fish in the River Trent

References

Fauna Britannica, Stefan Buczacki
 FishBase online

Fish
Great Britain
Fish
Fish
United Kindom